John Sydney Millar  (born 23 May 1934) is a former rugby union prop from Northern Ireland who played international rugby for Ireland and the British Lions. After retiring from playing rugby he became a rugby coach and later a rugby administrator. He became chairman of the Irish Rugby Union in 1995, and from 2003 until 2007 was the chairman of the International Rugby Board.

Early life
Syd Millar was born in Ballymena in Northern Ireland, the eldest of 6 children. He spent a period away as a sea cadet.

Rugby

Millar played at outside-half at school. A highly technical prop, he focused on the set-piece and could play on either side of the scrum.

Playing career
He played for his home town club, Ballymena RFC.

He first played for Ireland in 1958, and went on to win 37 caps as a prop. This included a 4-year gap when he was out of favour. His last international was in 1970.

He played 39 games for the British and Irish Lions, including 9 internationals, on 3 tours. Although tighthead was said to be his preference, he packed down at loosehead in both the 1959 and 1962 Lions series. He also played on the 1968 tour.

He also appeared 10 times for the Barbarians, including a win over the 1961 South African team.

Coach
Millar coached the hugely successful Lions tour to South Africa in 1974. According to Ian McGeechan, Millar was pivotal to the success of the tour.

Millar used information from ex-pats he knew in South Africa in his preparation.

Terry O’Connor (rugby writer) has said: “In my view Millar has always been under-rated as a coach and overshadowed by Carwyn James who was in charge of the 1971 team. Both rank among the world’s best and brought different qualities to their work. James was a visionary about back play but accepted that his forward knowledge at Test level was limited. Millar has proved over the years a master of forward tactics and in 1974 forged the finest pack ever to visit South Africa.”

Manager
Millar managed the Lions tour to South Africa in 1980. He was the manager of the Irish national side at the 1987 World Cup.

Administrator
Millar became the president of the Ulster Rugby Union in 1985, and was appointed as one of the representatives of the Irish Rugby Football Union (IRFU) to the IRB Council in 1992. He became president of the IRFU in 1995, and was also chairman of the British and Irish Lions from 1999 to 2002.

In 2002 the IRB Chairman Vernon Pugh became seriously ill. Millar was appointed as Vice-Chairman of the Board of the IRB on 16 September 2002, replacing New Zealander Rob Fisher. He took on the role of interim chairman after the death of Pugh in 2003.

Millar was elected as the IRB chairman in late 2003 to a four-year term commencing in 2004. He presided over a governance restructure and new strategic plan for the IRB, and was influential in the continued lobbying for Rugby sevens inclusion in the Summer Olympics. He stepped down from his posts at the IRB and the IRFU following the 2007 World Cup, and was succeeded as IRB chairman by Bernard Lapasset.

Honours
On  20 May 2004 he was awarded the Freedom of the Borough of Ballymena.

Millar was awarded the Honorary Degree of Doctor of Science by the University of Ulster in 1992, and was inducted into the International Rugby Hall of Fame in 2003. He was made a CBE in 2005 having previously been appointed MBE.

On 12 December 2007 Millar was appointed to the Légion d'honneur, France's highest decoration, at a ceremony in Ballymena Rugby Club, by Bernard Lapasset, his successor as IRB Chairman.

In 2009 he was inducted into the International Rugby Hall of Fame. Gavin Mairs (rugby writer) said: ”Millar’s contribution to rugby football has been nothing short of phenomenal – from player, coach, manager and lately world class administrator who presided over two outstanding Rugby World Cups and leaves the Game well equipped to continue its global expansion in the professional era.”

In 2016 he won the Vernon Pugh Award for Distinguished Service award.

References

External links
Ireland profile

Bibliography 

1934 births
People from Ballymena
Irish rugby union administrators
Irish rugby union coaches
Irish rugby union players
Ireland international rugby union players
Ulster Rugby players
Ballymena R.F.C. players
World Rugby Hall of Fame inductees
British & Irish Lions rugby union players from Ireland
Living people
British & Irish Lions coaches
Commanders of the Order of the British Empire
Rugby union players from Ballymena